Alonso de Cárdenas was the Spanish ambassador to London during the English Commonwealth. He was tasked with negotiating a potential alliance between Spain and the English Republic, but the talks stalled. He rejected several demands from Oliver Cromwell by declaring that this was asking Philip IV "to give up his two eyes". Cárdenas was withdrawn from his post following news that English forces had attacked Hispaniola as part of the Western Design, beginning the Anglo-Spanish War. Cromwell then aligned the Republic with Spain's enemy France.

Cárdenas also acted for his king and other Spanish collectors in the sales breaking up the art collection of Charles I.

Cárdenas was later the emissary of Philip to Charles II's exiled court in Brussels. In 1656 Cárdenas signed the Treaty of Brussels on behalf of Spain. It allied Madrid with the exiled British and Irish Royalists against their common enemies the English Commonwealth and France.

References

Bibliography
 Aubrey, Philip. Mr Secretary Thurloe: Cromwell's Secretary of State, 1652-1660. Athlone Press, 1990.
 Hainsworth, Roger. The Swordsmen in Power: War and Politics under the English Republic, 1649-1660. Sutton Publishing, 1997.

Spanish diplomats